Châtillon-sur-Cher is a commune in the Loir-et-Cher department in central France. It has a total area of 29.66 km sq (11.45 sq mi).

Population
Châtillon-sur-Cher has a population of 1691 with a population density of 57/km sq according to 2019 census.

See also
Communes of the Loir-et-Cher department

References

Communes of Loir-et-Cher